Pitkin Clark "Pit" Gilman (March 14, 1864 – August 17, 1950) was a Major League Baseball player. Gilman played for Cleveland Blues in the 1884 season. He only played in two games in his one-year career, having one hit in ten at-bats.

Gilman was born in Laporte, Ohio and died in Elyria, Ohio.

External links
Baseball-Reference.com page

Cleveland Blues (NL) players
1864 births
1950 deaths
Baseball players from Ohio
Youngstown (minor league baseball) players
Charleston Seagulls players
Toronto Canucks players
Columbus Senators players
Springfield Senators players
Evansville Hoosiers players
19th-century baseball players